The long-tailed weasel (Neogale frenata), also known as the bridled weasel, masked ermine, or big stoat, is a species of mustelid distributed from southern Canada throughout all the United States and Mexico, southward through all of Central America and into northern South America. It is distinct from the short-tailed weasel (Mustela erminea), also known as a "stoat", a close relation in the genus Mustela that originated in Eurasia and crossed into North America some half million years ago; the two species are visually similar, especially the black tail tip.

Taxonomy 
Originally described in the genus Mustela, a 2021 study reclassified it into the genus Neogale along with 2 other former Mustela species, as well as the two species formerly classified in Neovison.

Evolution

The long-tailed weasel is the product of a process begun 5–7 million years ago, when northern forests were replaced by open grassland, thus prompting an explosive evolution of small, burrowing rodents. The long-tailed weasel's ancestors were larger than the current form, and underwent a reduction in size to exploit the new food source. The long-tailed weasel arose in North America 2 million years ago, shortly before the stoat evolved as its mirror image in Eurasia. The species thrived during the Ice Age, as its small size and long body allowed it to easily operate beneath snow, as well as hunt in burrows. The long-tailed weasel and the stoat remained separated until half a million years ago, when falling sea levels exposed the Bering land bridge, thus allowing the stoat to cross into North America. However, unlike the latter species, the long-tailed weasel never crossed the land bridge, and did not spread into Eurasia.

Description
The long-tailed weasel is one of the larger weasels (comprising both Neogale and Mustela) in North America. It adds that in most populations, females are 10–15% smaller than males, thus making them about the same size as large male stoats, according to a second source. A third states they range from 11 to 22 inches (280–560 mm) in length, with the tail measuring an additional 3 to 6 inches (80–150 mm). It maintains the long-tailed weasel weighs between 3 and 9 ounces (85-267 g) with males being about twice as large as the females.

The eyes are black in daylight, but glow bright emerald green when caught in a spotlight at night. The dorsal fur is brown in summer, while the underparts are whitish and tinged with yellowish or buffy brown from the chin to the inguinal region. The tail has a distinct black tip. Long-tailed weasels in Florida and the southwestern US may have facial markings of a white or yellowish colour. In northern areas in winter, the long-tailed weasel's fur becomes white, sometimes with yellow tints, but the tail retains its black tip. The long-tailed weasel moults twice annually, once in autumn (October to mid-November) and once in spring (March–April). Each moult takes about 3–4 weeks and is governed by day length and mediated by the pituitary gland. Unlike the stoat, whose soles are thickly furred all year, the long-tailed weasel's soles are naked in summer. The long-tailed weasel has well-developed anal scent glands, which produce a strong and musky odour. Unlike skunks, which spray their musk, the long-tailed weasel drags and rubs its body over surfaces in order to leave the scent, to mark their territory and, when startled or threatened, to discourage predators.

Identification

Tracks and scat
The footprint of a long-tailed weasel is about 1 inch (25 mm) long. Although they have five toes, only four of them can be seen in their tracks. The only exception to this is when walking in the snow or mud, all five of their toes are shown. Their footprints will also appear heavier if the weasel is carrying food. Another way to determine the presence of a weasel is by looking for wavy indents made by their tails in the snow.

The long-tailed weasel uses one spot to leave their feces. This spot is usually near where they burrow. They'll continuously use this spot for their droppings until it gets covered by environmental changes.

Distinguishing features

A black-tipped tail, yellowish-white belly fur, and brown fur on its back and sides are distinguishing for the long-tailed weasel. Additionally, the long-tailed weasel has long whiskers, a long narrow body, and a long tail that is approximately half the length of the body and head of the weasel. Compared to the short-tailed weasel the long-tailed weasel lacks a white line on the insides of its legs.

Behaviour

Reproduction and development
The long-tailed weasel mates in July–August, with implantation of the fertilized egg on the uterine wall being delayed until about March. The gestation period lasts 10 months, with actual embryonic development taking place only during the last four weeks of this period, an adaptation to timing births for spring, when small mammals are abundant. Litter size generally consists of 5–8 kits, which are born in April–May. The kits are born partially naked, blind and weighing 3 grams, about the same weight of a hummingbird. The long-tailed weasel's growth rate is rapid, as by the age of three weeks, the kits are well furred, can crawl outside the nest and eat meat. At this time, the kits weigh 21–27 grams. At five weeks of age, the kit's eyes open, and the young become physically active and vocal. Weaning begins at this stage, with the kits emerging from the nest and accompanying the mother in hunting trips a week later. The kits are fully grown by autumn, at which time the family disbands. The females are able to breed at 3–4 months of age, while males become sexually mature at 15–18 months.

Denning and sheltering behaviour
The long-tailed weasel dens in ground burrows, under stumps or beneath rock piles. It usually does not dig its own burrows, but commonly uses abandoned chipmunk holes.

Defense
The enemies of the long-tailed weasel are usually coyotes, foxes, wildcats, wolves, and the Canadian lynx. The weasel will give off its musky odor, however, this is not primarily used when encountering other creatures. When leaving an area they were just in, they will leave their odor behind. This is done by the weasels taking themselves and hauling their bodies across surfaces they just interacted with. The long-tailed weasel does this to "discourage predators" from coming back to the area, possibly indicating that the weasel considers this a safe haven for return. This type of reaction is also reserved for when the weasel feels it is in danger, or when it is looking for a mate. Tree-climbing is another type of defense mechanism that long-tailed weasels utilize against predators on the ground. These weasels will climb up a reasonable height of a tree when they sense that they are in danger. They will then sit silent and "motionless", while looking at their presumed predator. These weasels keep their guard up like this until the predator leaves, and when the weasel considers itself no longer in danger.

Another common defense of long-tailed weasels is its black-tipped tail, which differs in color from the rest of the body. When the long-tailed weasel becomes more white in the winter, this defense mechanism is especially used. The black-tipped tail distracts predators from the rest of the body, as it is more visible to the eye of a predator. This causes the visibility of the actual weasel to be rather difficult and makes the predator attack the tail instead of the weasel. The weasel is allowed to escape the predator because of this.

Diet

The long-tailed weasel is a fearless and aggressive hunter which may attack animals far larger than itself. When stalking, it waves its head from side to side in order to pick up the scent of its prey. It hunts small prey, such as mice, by rushing at them and killing them with one bite to the head. With large prey, such as rabbits, the long-tailed weasel strikes quickly, taking its prey off guard. It grabs the nearest part of the animal and climbs upon its body, maintaining its hold with its feet. The long-tailed weasel then manoeuvres itself to inflict a lethal bite to the neck.

The long-tailed weasel is an obligate carnivore which prefers its prey to be fresh or alive, eating only the carrion stored within its burrows. Rodents are almost exclusively taken when they are available. Its primary prey consists of mice, rats, squirrels, chipmunks, shrews, moles and rabbits. Occasionally, it may eat small birds, bird eggs, reptiles, amphibians, fish, earthworms and some insects. The species has also been observed to take bats from nursery colonies. It occasionally surplus kills, usually in spring when the kits are being fed, and again in autumn. Some of the surplus kills may be cached, but are usually left uneaten. Kits in captivity eat from ¼–½ of their body weight in 24 hours, while adults eat only one fifth to one third. After killing its prey, the long-tailed weasel laps up the blood, but does not suck it, as is popularly believed. With small prey, also the fur, feathers, flesh and bones are consumed, but only some flesh is eaten from large prey. When stealing eggs, the long-tailed weasel removes each egg from its nest one at a time, then carries it in its mouth to a safe location where it bites off the top and licks out the contents or if they have babies in the den they may hold it in their mouth all the way back to them.

Subspecies
, 42 subspecies are recognised.

Cultural meanings 
In North America, Native Americans (in the region of Chatham County, North Carolina) deemed the long-tailed weasel to be a bad sign; crossing its path meant a "speedy death".

References

Notes

Bibliography

External links

Weasels
Carnivorans of North America
Carnivorans of Central America
Carnivorans of South America
Mammals of Canada
Mammals of Colombia
Mammals of Ecuador
Mammals of Mexico
Mammals of Peru
Mammals of the United States
Mammals of Venezuela
Least concern biota of North America
Least concern biota of South America
Mammals described in 1831
Taxobox binomials not recognized by IUCN
Taxa named by Hinrich Lichtenstein